Henry FitzGerald may refer to 
 Henry FitzGerald, 12th Earl of Kildare (1562–97)
 Lord Henry FitzGerald (1761–1829)  Irish MP and Privy Councillor
 Henry FitzGerald-de Ros, 22nd Baron de Ros (1793–1839) son of Lord Henry FitzGerald, MP for West Looe
 Henry fitzGerold (d. c. 1174) - Anglo-Norman official

See also
 Thomas Henry FitzGerald (1824–88)  Australian sugar cane farmer
 Fitzgerald Henry aka "the Mighty Terror" (1921–2007) Trinidadian calypso singer